Ábel Kenyeres (born 14 February 1994) is a Hungarian racing cyclist. He rode at the 2013 UCI Road World Championships.

References

External links
 
 
 

1994 births
Living people
Hungarian male cyclists
Place of birth missing (living people)